Dave Jacoby (born in East Sparta, Ohio) is an American powerlifter. He won five International Powerlifting Federation World Championships in 1984, 1985, 1987, 1988 and 1992.

IPF Men's World Championships Men -110kg

Other championships

References

Year of birth missing (living people)
Living people
American male weightlifters
American powerlifters
Sportspeople from Ohio